Courtenay-Comox is a provincial electoral district for the Legislative Assembly of British Columbia, Canada that was created in the 2015 redistribution from parts of Comox Valley.

It was contested for the first time in the 2017 election. On election night, the seat was declared as won by Ronna-Rae Leonard of the British Columbia New Democratic Party, by a margin of just nine votes over Jim Benninger of the British Columbia Liberal Party. A recount, as well as the counting of absentee ballots, pushed Leonard's lead to 189 votes over Benninger when final results were announced fifteen days after the election on May 24, 2017.

Demographics

History

Election results

References

External links 
Hi-Res Map (pdf)

British Columbia provincial electoral districts on Vancouver Island
Courtenay, British Columbia